The Thirteen Buddhist Sites of Kobe（神戸十三仏霊場, Kobe jūsan butsu reijō）are a group of 13 Buddhist sacred sites in Hyōgo Prefecture, Japan. The temples are dedicated to the Thirteen Buddhas, and the temple grouping was established in 1994.

Directory

See also
 Thirteen Buddhas

External links
Official website for pilgrimage association (Japanese)

Buddhist temples in Hyōgo Prefecture
Buddhist pilgrimage sites in Japan